The name Seowoncheon is also applied to the portion of the Jungnangcheon which separates Seoul from Gyeonggi Province.

The Seowoncheon is a stream which flows through Iseo-myeon in Cheongdo County, southern Gyeongsangbuk-do, South Korea.  It is a third-level tributary of the Nakdong River, as it flows into the Cheongdocheon, which in turn flows into the Miryang River, which in turn flows into the Nakdong.  It rises from the slopes of Bonghwasan, which stands on the border of Cheongdo County and Daegu.

The Seowoncheon takes its name from two seowon near its course.  These are the Heungseon Seowon and Geumho Seowon.  Seowon were the principal form of private education during the Joseon Dynasty.

The Seowoncheon is best known for the Cheongdo Bullfighting Festival, which is held once a year on its broad and sandy banks.

See also
List of rivers in South Korea
Geography of South Korea

Landforms of North Gyeongsang Province
Rivers of South Korea
Cheongdo County